Tetrazene (1-(5-tetrazolyl)-3-guanyl tetrazene hydrate)  is an explosive material used for sensitization of priming compositions.  It is a derivative of the compound with the IUPAC name tetrazene.

Tetrazene is slightly more impact-sensitive than mercury fulminate. When pressed enough, its sensitivity is reduced or destroyed; this is known as dead pressing. It also decomposes in boiling water. In contact with fire, it readily explodes, producing large amounts of black smoke. It is prepared by reacting sodium nitrite with an aminoguanidine salt dissolved in acetic acid at 30–40 °C.

Reactions

Decomposition
The decomposition of tetrazene is quite rapid around 90 °C. A sample of tetrazene was heated in an oven at 90 °C and its rate of thermal decomposition was monitored by infrared and ultraviolet spectroscopy. The thermal decomposition reaction is autocatalytic and it is likely that the same reaction can occur at even lower temperatures, however at much slower rates.

Sensitivity to friction
Many explosives are considered to be highly sensitive to mechanical stimuli such as impact, friction, stab, heat, static electricity, flame, etc. Since explosive compounds are subject to friction practically every time they are handled, it is of particular interest to be aware of the sensitivity to friction. The sensitivity of tetrazene was determined using a FSKM-PEx friction sensitivity tester. The probability of ignition of tetrazene is 100 percent likely at 27N of frictional force.

Hazards

Instances of occupational rhinitis, dermatitis, and asthma  have been reported due to prolonged exposure to tetrazene.

References 

Nitrogen compounds
Explosive chemicals
Azo compounds